George Senick (b. September 16, 1929 in Saskatoon, Saskatchewan - d. January 13, 2003) was a professional ice hockey player who played 13 games in the National Hockey League.  He played with the New York Rangers.

External links

1929 births
2003 deaths
Canadian ice hockey left wingers
Ice hockey people from Saskatchewan
New York Rangers players
Saskatoon Blades coaches
Sportspeople from Saskatoon
Canadian ice hockey coaches